Seddiqin Argument or the argument of the righteous is an argument for the existence of God in Islamic philosophy. This argument was explained by Islamic philosophers such as Avicenna, Mulla Sadra and Muhammad Husayn Tabataba'i.

The name of Seddiqin
Seddiqin means the argument of the sincere men or truthful ones. Seddiqin refers to those who are just argue for the God's existence only through God. In other words, in this argument, the existence of God argued only through existence. According to Legenhausen the Seddiqin is a synonym of "sincere" and an antonym of 
"hypocritical". The word "Seddiqin" is a sighah mubalighah in Arabic grammar which shows extra attribution. Consequently, Seddiqin means those who are extremist in faith and belief.

Historical views
The Seddiqin counted as one of the lasting and permanent argument in  Islamic philosophy for the existence of God. This argument also posed by most of Islamic philosophers in different explanation to justify the Necessity Being. It seems that one who first presented the argument is Avicenna. after him, many of Islamic philosophers try to show other explanation of the Seddiqin argument.

Avicenna's Argument

Avicenna detailed the argument for the existence of God in three books: Al-Shifa (The Book of Healing), Al-Nejat, and Al-isharat wa al-tanbihat. This seems to be the first application of the Seddiqin argument. According to Muhammad Legenhausen, few people gave much credence to Avicenna's proof. Avicenna described the argument as seddiqin (Borhane seddiqin) because this argumentation applies to those who are truthful. According to Avicenn, those who are truthful persons possess an argument which is pure truth and with no signs of untruthfulness. In other words, Seddiqin argues for the existence of God and truth by one argument: the essence of Truth and God. Avicenna refers to the argument as follows:

Also Avicenna quotes the Quran to support the argumentation: "Is it not sufficient as regards your Lord that he is witness over all things" (Surah 41, verse 53).

Avicenna focuses on the view that God is a necessary being in himself. This argument is based on contingency. The claim of Avicenna is that we can establish the existence of God directly by consideration of his existence itself. In the proof of sincere men, Avicenna tries to reach the existence of God through an analysis of existence itself along with the supposition that God is the necessary existent. According to him, if we reflect on any things generally and consider only their existence, then the existence is either necessary or not. If the existence is necessary then it is God (called al-Wajib al-wujud), and if the existent is not necessary then it is impossible or contingent. It is not impossible because we assume that it is something therefore it must be contingent. In fact, if we consider the existence of existent alone then it is either the necessary or contingent. The contingent, in respect to its existence, needed ab alio or something which brings it into existence. The preponderant itself is necessary or contingent. If it is necessary, then it is God. If it is contingent, then it is in need of a transcendent cause. The series of these transcendent causes themselves are finite or infinite. The finite series finally arrives at God, since the last member doesn't need any cause and is therefore, by itself, the Necessary Existent. If the series was infinite, then the series as a whole needed its components in its existence and therefore must be contingent.

Shihab al-Din Yahya Suhrawardi’s Argument
Suhrawardi, founder of illuminatinism, also referred to the seddiqin. This version is important because he introduced mystical ideas into the argument. In addition, Mulla Sadra Shirazi was closer to Suhrawardi than was Avicenna. Suhrawardi had distinct terminology for the argument. For instance, he used "the lights of light" in place of God or necessary being. He used "rich" for necessary being and "poor" for contingent being. His argument in his collected works are as follows:

Of course, the above argument depends upon the impossibility of an infinite regress, but in other books he presents an argument in which there is no need for the supposition of infinite regress. This argument is as follows:

This argument has a close link with the metaphor of light. According to Surawardi, if we suppose that existence is contingent then, if the regress of infinite is impossible, consequently there must be a first.

Mulla Sadra's Argument
Mulla Sadra explained the proof of the sincere in a way different from both Avicenna's version as well as Suhrevardi's. The differentiation with Avicenna differs in the argument of the existence as an existent. Mulla Sadra begins his argument with an existent in the world until he reaches the necessary existent. Mulla Sadra also rejects Suhrawardi’s statement of the argument from contingency.

See also
Kalam cosmological argument in Islamic philosophy

References

Islamic philosophy
Arguments for the existence of God